is a passenger railway station located in the city of  Tatsuno, Hyōgo Prefecture, Japan, operated by the West Japan Railway Company (JR West).

Lines

Station layout
The station consists of two ground-level opposed side platforms connected by a footbridge. The station has a Midori no Madoguchi staffed ticket office.

Platforms

Adjacent stations

|-
!colspan=5|JR West

History
Tatsuno Station was opened on 11 November 1889. With the privatization of the Japan National Railways (JNR) on 1 April 1987, the station came under the aegis of the West Japan Railway Company.

Passenger statistics
In fiscal 2019, the station was used by an average of 2204 passengers daily

Surrounding area
Tatsuno City Hall Ibogawa General Branch (formerly Ibogawa Town Hall)
Tatsuno City General Cultural Center Aqua Hall
Ibogawa Post Office

See also
List of railway stations in Japan

References

External links

 JR West Station Official Site

Sanyō Main Line
Railway stations in Japan opened in 1889
Railway stations in Hyōgo Prefecture
Tatsuno, Hyōgo